Quercus thorelii is an Asian species of tree in the beech family Fagaceae. The species is named after the French botanist Clovis Thorel. It has been found in Indochina (Laos, Vietnam) and in southern China (Guangxi, Yunnan). It is placed in subgenus Cerris, section Cyclobalanopsis, the ring-cupped oaks.

Quercus thorelii is a tree up to 30 m. tall. Twigs are covered with star-shaped hairs. Leaves can be as much as 170 mm long.  The acorn is oblate, 10-15 × 25-30 mm, light brown, densely tomentose, apex depressed, with a scar that is approx. 20 mm in diameter.

References

External links
line drawing, Flora of China Illustrations vol. 4, fig. 391, drawings 3-4 at lower left

thorelii
Flora of China
Flora of Indo-China
Trees of Vietnam
Plants described in 1923
Taxa named by Aimée Antoinette Camus